Dutchtown (Dutch: Duitsestad) is a hamlet  in the town of Holland in Erie County, New York, United States.

References

Dutch-American culture in New York (state)
Hamlets in New York (state)
Hamlets in Erie County, New York